The 2019–20 UC Santa Barbara Gauchos men's basketball team represent the University of California, Santa Barbara in the 2019–20 NCAA Division I men's basketball season. The Gauchos, led by 3rd-year head coach Joe Pasternack, play their home games at The Thunderdome in Santa Barbara, California as members of the Big West Conference.

Previous season
The Gauchos finished the 2018–19 season 22–10 overall, 10–6 in Big West play, finishing in 2nd place. In the Big West tournament, they defeated Cal State Northridge in the quarterfinals, before falling to Cal State Fullerton in the semifinals.

Roster

Schedule and results

|-
!colspan=12 style=| Non-conference regular season

|-
!colspan=9 style=| Big West regular season

|-
!colspan=12 style=| Big West tournament
|-

|-

Source

References

UC Santa Barbara Gauchos men's basketball seasons
UC Santa Barbara Gauchos
UC Santa Barbara Gauchos men's basketball
UC Santa Barbara Gauchos men's basketball